"Drive" is a song written by Phil Thornalley and Bryan Adams that was the second single released by Australian singer-songwriter Shannon Noll on 19 April 2004. The single, the second to be lifted from Noll's debut album, That's What I'm Talking About (2004), was Noll's second top-10 hit, debuting and peaking at  4 on the Australian ARIA Singles Chart. The single was certified platinum with shipments of 70,000 in Australia.

The track, originally demoed by Adams, was sent to Noll for inclusion on his debut album. Adams later asked Noll to support him on his Australian tour in 2004 and the pair became friends. It was rumoured that Noll was to collaborate with Adams on a track for his second album "Lift"; however, it is unknown if the pair worked together.

Music video

The video, directed by Australian director Anthony Rose, was the third music video from Shannon Noll. The video was created as a mini-movie, with Noll playing the part of a motor-mechanic summoned to fix an ailing black car by an obnoxious and pushy man and his seemingly long-suffering girlfriend. The car used in the video is a 1973 XB Ford Falcon Coupe. The video was named best music video of 2004 in a readers poll conducted by Australia's TV Week magazine, and was placed at number 66 in a countdown of the Top 100 music videos of all time on the television show "Video Hits".

Track listing
Australian maxi-CD single
 "Drive" 
 "Let Me Fall With You" 
 "Working Class Man" 
 "What About Me" (video)

Personnel
Personnel are taken from the Australian maxi-CD single liner notes.

 Phil Thornalley – writing
 Bryan Adams – writing
 Shannon Noll – vocals
 Liam Shields – backing vocals
 Dave Leslie – guitars
 Sam Dixon – bass
 Adam Reily – production, programming
 Bryon Jones – production
 Oscar Gaona – mastering
 Sussanne Caccamo – artwork design
 David Anderson – photography

Charts

Weekly charts

Year-end charts

Certifications

References

2004 singles
2004 songs
Aaron Pritchett songs
Shannon Noll songs
Songs written by Bryan Adams
Songs written by Phil Thornalley
Sony Music Australia singles